The Sweeney Clock is a 1908 clock installed near Houston's Tranquillity Park, in the U.S. state of Texas. The clock was originally installed outside the J.J. Sweeney & Co. jewelry store at the intersection of Main and Prairie, from 1908 to 1928. It was relocated to the Farmer's Market in 1929, then went into storage. Sweeney Clock was placed in its current location in 1968.

References

Buildings and structures completed in 1908
Buildings and structures in Houston
Clocks in the United States